Peter Ankersen (born 22 September 1990) is a Danish professional footballer who plays as a right-back for Danish Superliga club FC Copenhagen.

Club career
Getting his football education in the youth ranks of local team Esbjerg fB, he saw limited first team opportunities, and in the summer of 2010 he decided to join Vejle Boldklub in the Danish 1st Division.

After two successful seasons for Vejle, both of them in the Danish 1st division, bigger teams started to pay him attention. In March 2012 he was sold to Norwegian club Rosenborg BK.

He became a regular first team starter for the Norwegian side, but after only 18 games he had yet to settle personally. In the same summer he was sold back to his childhood club Esbjerg fB on a four-year contract.

During his second stay at Esbjerg, alongside twin brother Jakob Ankersen, played an integral part of the Esbjerg team that following promotion won the Danish Cup and finished 4th in the Danish Superliga.

During a 5–1 win over AGF Aarhus on 10 August 2013, Ankersen scored a sensational goal reminiscent of Marco van Basten's strike in the final of Euro 88. The goal was shortlisted for the 2013 FIFA Puskás Award.

In January 2014 he was signed by RB Salzburg after impressing a against them in the group stages of the Europa league, and was praised for his ability to play on either defensive flank.

He joined F.C. Copenhagen in the summer of 2015 initially on loan, before signing permanently the season after. He was linked with a move to the Premier League club Newcastle United. Ankersen was nominated for the goal of the season by the Danish football federation in 2017.

On transfer deadline day, 2 September 2019, Ankersen joined Italian Serie A club Genoa on a contract until June 2021 with an option for a further year. He made 19 league appearances during his sole season with Genoa, where he was mostly used as a substitute.

On 26 September 2020, FC Copenhagen announced that they had signed Ankersen on a four-year contract.

On 1 October 2020, Ankersen scored a highly bizarre own goal against Croatian club HNK Rijeka in the 2020-21 UEFA Europa League play-off round. The own goal proved to be decisive and FCK was eliminated.

International career
On 17 May 2013, Ankersen was called up for the Denmark national team for a friendly against Georgia. In the match, he remained an unused sub for the entire game.

On 14 August 2013, he made his international debut in a 3–2 loss to Poland, coming on as a substitute for Nicolai Boilesen at half-time.

Ankersen scored his first goal ever in Denmark national team colours on 11 November 2016 in a 2018 FIFA World Cup qualification match against Kazakhstan. Denmark won 4–1.

After being named in Denmark’s preliminary 35-man squad for the 2018 World Cup in Russia in May 2018. However, he did not make the final 23.

Personal life
He is the twin brother of Randers player Jakob Ankersen.

Career statistics

Club

International
Scores and results list Denmark's goal tally first, score column indicates score after each Ankersen goal.

|+ List of international goals scored by Peter Ankersen
|-
| style="text-align:center"|1 || 11 November 2016 || Parken Stadium, Copenhagen, Denmark ||  || style="text-style="text-align:center"|3–1 || style="text-align:center"|4–1 || 2018 FIFA World Cup qualification
|-
|}

Honours
Esbjerg
 Danish Cup: 2012–13

Salzburg
 Austrian Football Bundesliga: 2014–15
 Austrian Cup: 2014–15

Copenhagen
 Danish Superliga: 2015–16, 2016–17, 2018–19, 2021–22
 Danish Cup: 2015–16, 2016–17

References

External links
Esbjerg fB profile

1990 births
Living people
People from Esbjerg
Danish twins
Sportspeople from the Region of Southern Denmark
Danish men's footballers
Association football fullbacks
Denmark international footballers
Danish Superliga players
Danish 1st Division players
Eliteserien players
Austrian Football Bundesliga players
Serie A players
Esbjerg fB players
Vejle Boldklub players
Rosenborg BK players
FC Red Bull Salzburg players
F.C. Copenhagen players
Genoa C.F.C. players
Danish expatriate men's footballers
Expatriate footballers in Austria
Danish expatriate sportspeople in Austria
Expatriate footballers in Norway
Danish expatriate sportspeople in Norway
Expatriate footballers in Italy
Danish expatriate sportspeople in Italy